2120 Tyumenia is a dark background asteroid, approximately  in diameter, located in the outer regions of the asteroid belt. It was discovered on 9 September 1967, by Soviet astronomer Tamara Smirnova at the Crimean Astrophysical Observatory in Nauchnyj, on the Crimean peninsula. The asteroid was named for the now Russian district of Tyumen Oblast in Western Siberia.

Orbit and classification 

Tyumenia is a non-family asteroid from the main belt's background population. It orbits the Sun in the outer asteroid belt at a distance of 2.7–3.4 AU once every 5 years and 4 months (1,954 days; semi-major axis of 3.06 AU). Its orbit has an eccentricity of 0.13 and an inclination of 18° with respect to the ecliptic.

Naming 

This minor planet was named after the district of Tyumen Oblast of the former Russian Soviet Federative Socialist Republic (1917–1991). Tyumen Oblast is located east of the Ural Mountains in Western Siberia, in the center of an oil-gas basin. The region is Russia's largest producer of oil and natural gas. The official naming citation was published by the Minor Planet Center on 1 April 1980.

Physical characteristics 

Tyumenia is an assumed carbonaceous C-type asteroid.

Rotation period 

Three rotational lightcurves of Tyumenia have been obtained from photometric observations since 2004.(). The consolidated lightcurve gave a short rotation period of 2.769 hours with a brightness amplitude between 0.33 and 0.39 magnitude.

Diameter and albedo 

According to the surveys carried out by the Infrared Astronomical Satellite IRAS, the Japanese Akari satellite and the NEOWISE mission of NASA's Wide-field Infrared Survey Explorer, Tyumenia measures between 38.619 and 51.49 kilometers in diameter and its surface has an albedo between 0.029 and 0.0819. The Collaborative Asteroid Lightcurve Link derives an albedo of 0.0420 and a diameter of 40.93 kilometers based on an absolute magnitude of 11.0.

Notes

References

External links 
 Lightcurve Database Query (LCDB), at www.minorplanet.info
 Dictionary of Minor Planet Names, Google books
 Asteroids and comets rotation curves, CdR – Geneva Observatory, Raoul Behrend
 Discovery Circumstances: Numbered Minor Planets (1)-(5000) – Minor Planet Center
 
 

002120
Discoveries by Tamara Mikhaylovna Smirnova
Named minor planets
19670909